Calcitonin gene-related peptide (CGRP) receptor antagonists are a class of drugs that act as antagonists of the calcitonin gene-related peptide receptor (CGRPR).

Several monoclonal antibodies that bind to the CGRP receptor or peptide have been approved for prevention of migraine. Three small molecule CGRPR antagonists are approved in the U.S. as antimigraine agents. Drugs of this class have also been investigated for use in osteoarthritis.

Examples

Non-peptide small molecules 
 Ubrogepant is approved for acute treatment of migraines
Rimegepant (BMS-927711) is approved for acute and preventative treatment of migraines
Atogepant (AGN-241689) is approved for preventative treatment of migraines
Telcagepant (MK-0974), reached phase III clinical trials; development discontinued in 2011.
Olcegepant (BIBN-4096BS) is a drug candidate
BI 44370 TA (BI 44370)
 MK-3207
 SB-268262
 Zavegepant (BHV- 3500) Nasal spray being developed by Pfizer. Zavegepant was approved for medical use in the United States in March 2023.

Monoclonal antibodies targeting the CGRP receptor
 Erenumab (AMG-334) is approved for prevention of migraine.

Monoclonal antibodies targeting the CGRP molecule
 Eptinezumab  (ALD403) is approved for prevention of migraine.
 Fremanezumab (TEV-48125) is approved for prevention of migraine.
 Galcanezumab (LY2951742) is approved for prevention of migraine and cluster headaches.

Necrotizing fasciitis
A study has found botox effective against necrotizing fasciitis caused by S. pyogenes in mice.  Its mechanism of action is by blocking CGRP receptor of nerve cells, which trigger intense pain and activate CGRP cascade, which prevents the immune system attacks to control the pathogen.  Botox blocks the CGRP cascade of nerve cells.

Migraine
As of 2018, erenumab, brand name Aimovig, was approved in the U.S. for use for migraines. It interacts by blocking the CGRP receptor. As of 2018, fremanezumab, brand name Ajovy, was approved in the U.S. for use for migraines. It interacts with the CGRP protein expressed during an attack. The third approved treatment, as of 2018, galcanezumab, brand name Emgality, was approved in the U.S. for use in migraines. It also interacts with the protein.

As of February 2020, eptinezumab (Vyepti) was approved by the FDA for the treatment of migraine via intravenous infusion as well.

Three small-molecule antagonists have been approved for treatment of migraine: ubrogepant, rimegepant, and atogepant. Ubrogepant and rimegepant are approved for acute treatment. Atogepant and rimegepant are approved for preventative treatment.

Metabolic health
Mice given a CGRP receptor antagonist improved insulin secretion and reduced chronic inflammation, improving the metabolic health of the animals.

References

Antimigraine drugs
Receptor antagonists